Limapontioidea are a superseded superfamily of sea slugs, marine gastropod mollusks within the superorder Sacoglossa. 

It is now accepted as a synonym of the superfamily Plakobranchoidea Gray, 1840.

Families
Families within the superfamily Limapontioidea include:
Family Caliphyllidae Tiberi, 1881
 Family Costasiellidae K. B. Clarke, 1984
Family Hermaeidae H. Adams & A. Adams, 1854
Family Limapontiidae  Gray, 1847
Families and subfamilies brought into synonymy 
 Alderiidae : synonym of Limapontiidae
 Costasiellidae : synonym of  Limapontiidae
 Ercolaniinae : synonym of  Limapontiidae
 Lobiferidae : synonym of Caliphyllidae
 Oleidae : synonym of  Limapontiidae
 Phyllobranchidae : synonym of  Caliphyllidae
 Phyllobranchillidae : synonym of  Caliphyllidae
 Polybranchiidae : synonym of  Caliphyllidae
 Pontolimacidae : synonym of  Limapontiidae
 Stiligeridae : synonym of  Limapontiidae

References

 
Panpulmonata